The Lady in Black (Swedish: Damen i svart) is a 1958 Swedish mystery thriller film directed by Arne Mattsson. It was shot at the Centrumateljéerna Studios in Stockholm with sets designed by the art director Bibi Lindström. The film is the first film in director Arne Mattsson's Hillman-series of five thriller films, all containing a colour in the title: The Lady in Black (1958), Mannequin in Red (1958), Rider in Blue (1959), The Lady in White (1962), and The Yellow Car (1963).

Plot summary 
Private detectives John and Kajsa Hillman are visiting friends on Holmfors mill when several people disappear mysteriously. A young lady disappears one night at the mill. She was seen going off to post a letter, and then just vanishes. That same night, the "family ghost" The Lady in Black was visible, a bad omen. Many people at the mill and its surroundings have their motives and many have also behaved mysteriously.

Cast
Karl-Arne Holmsten as John Hillman, private detective
Annalisa Ericson as Kajsa Hillman, his wife 
Nils Hallberg as Freddy Sjöström, Hillmans assistant 
Anita Björk as Inger von Schilden 
Sven Lindberg as Christian von Schilden, her husband 
Isa Quensel as Cecilia von Schilden, his sister 
Lena Granhagen as Sonja Svensson, a model
Sif Ruud as Aina Engström, a sculptor
Lennart Lindberg as Björn Sandgren
Torsten Winge as Hansson, the mysterious man
Åke Lindman as David Frohm
 Sonja Westerbergh as Maja
 Ingrid Borthen as 	Dagmar Frohm
 Kotti Chave as Sune Öhrgren
 Catherine Berg as 	Ann-Marie Hansson
 John Norrman as 	Andersson
 Margareta Bergman as 	Nanna
 John Melin as Bus Driver
 Curt Löwgren as 	Erik
 Per-Axel Arosenius as 	Johansson, Policeman 
 Erik Strandell as 	Police
 Per-Olof Ekvall as 	Police

References

Bibliography 
 Qvist, Per Olov & von Bagh, Peter. Guide to the Cinema of Sweden and Finland. Greenwood Publishing Group, 2000.

External links 

Swedish thriller films
1950s Swedish-language films
1950s thriller films
1950s mystery films
Swedish mystery films
1958 films
Films directed by Arne Mattsson
1950s Swedish films